Henderson v Merrett Syndicates Ltd [1994] UKHL 5 was a landmark House of Lords case. It established the possibility of concurrent liability in both tort and contract.

Facts
Lloyd's of London, an insurance market, is organised in syndicates - groups who share the business, risk, and reward, of underwriting insurance policies and similar projects. The syndicate acts as a market which offers insurance on the one hand and investment opportunity on the other. The active business of a syndicate is run by underwriting agents. The liability of an investor (known as a "name") is unlimited - names share the profits but are also exposed to unlimited liability in the event of losses.

In the present case, hurricanes in United States had led to unprecedented losses for insurers. After the hurricanes, Lloyd's called upon the investors to cover their share of these losses. Litigation followed in which the names sued the people running the underwriting agents for negligent management of the investment fund. Mr Henderson was one of the names and Merrett Syndicates Ltd was one of the underwriting agents.

It was accepted that the underwriting agents had a duty to exercise due care and skill (see for instance, s 13 Supply of Goods and Services Act 1982). The question was whether the agents could be liable to the indirect investors (the names behind in the syndicate which had formed another syndicate). The problem was that there was a contractual relationship between the head syndicate managers and its direct members, but not necessarily a contractual relationship between the head syndicate managers and the members of the sub-syndicate. This led to the question of whether a duty could arise in tort, raising the matter of "assumption of responsibility"..

Judgment
It was held that Merrett Syndicates was liable to both types of shareholders, as there was enough foreseeability to extend pure economic loss liability to "un-proximate" third parties. The major significance here was, however, the allowance of claims in both contract and tort, which blurred the divide between the two. Some of the first party Names claimed in tort to overcome the three-year limit in which an action must be taken in contract. In allowing such an action, the House of Lords expressly overruled Lord Scarman's ruling in Tai Hing Cotton Mill Ltd v Liu Chong Hing Bank Ltd [1986], in which it was held that: "there is nothing advantageous to the law's development in searching for a liability in tort where the parties are in a contractual relationship." The allowance of concurrent actions was immensely controversial, as it ran contrary to legal orthodoxy.

Lord Goff said the following.

See also

Caparo Industries plc v Dickman
La règle de non-cumul in French law

Notes

English contract case law
English tort case law
House of Lords cases
English privity case law
1994 in case law
1994 in British law